This is a shortened version of the seventh chapter of the ICD-9: Diseases of the Circulatory System. It covers ICD codes 259 to 282. The full chapter can be found on pages 215 to 258 of Volume 1, which contains all (sub)categories of the ICD-9. Volume 2 is an alphabetical index of Volume 1. Both volumes can be downloaded for free from the website of the World Health Organization.

Acute rheumatic fever (390–392)
  Rheumatic fever without mention of heart involvement
  Rheumatic fever with heart involvement
  Rheumatic heart disease, unspec.
  Rheumatic chorea

Chronic rheumatic heart disease (393–398)
  Chronic rheumatic pericarditis
  Diseases of mitral valve
  Mitral stenosis
  Rheumatic mitral insufficiency
  Mitral stenosis with insufficiency
  Other and unspecified
  Diseases of aortic valve
  Rheumatic aortic stenosis
  Rheumatic aortic insufficiency
  Rheumatic aortic stenosis with insufficiency
  Other and unspecified
  Diseases of mitral and aortic valves
  Diseases of other endocardial structures
  Diseases of tricuspid valve
  Rheumatic diseases of pulmonary valve
  Rheumatic diseases of endocardium, valve unspecified
  Other rheumatic heart disease
  Rheumatic myocarditis
  Other and unspecified

Hypertensive disease (401–405)
  Essential hypertension
  Hypertension, malignant
  Hypertension, benign
  Hypertension, unspecified
  Hypertensive heart disease
  Hypertensive renal disease
  Malignant hypertensive renal disease
  Benign hypertensive renal disease
  Hypertensive heart and renal disease
  Secondary hypertension
  Malignant secondary hypertension
  Hypertension, renovascular, malignant
  Benign secondary hypertension
  Hypertension, renovascular, benign

Ischemic heart disease (410–414)
  Acute myocardial infarction
  MI, acute, anterolateral
  MI, acute, anterior, NOS
  MI, acute, inferolateral
  MI, acute, inferoposterior
  MI, acute, other inferior wall, NOS
  MI, acute, other lateral wall
  MI, acute, true posterior
  MI, acute, subendocardial
  MI, acute, spec.
  MI, acute, unspec.
  Other acute and subacute forms of ischemic heart disease
  Postmyocardial infarction syndrome
  Intermediate coronary syndrome
  Old myocardial infarction
  Angina pectoris
  Angina decubitus
  Prinzmetal angina
  Other forms of chronic ischemic heart disease
  Coronary atherosclerosis
  Aneurysm and dissection of heart
  Aneurysm of heart (wall)
  Aneurysm of coronary vessels
  Dissection of coronary artery
  Ischemic heart disease, chronic, other
  Ischemic heart disease, chronic, unspec.

Diseases of pulmonary circulation (415–417)
  Acute pulmonary heart disease
  Acute cor pulmonale
  Pulmonary embolism and infarction
  Iatrogenic pulmonary embolism and infarction
  Septic pulmonary embolism
  Other pulmonary embolism and infarction
  Chronic pulmonary heart disease
  Primary pulmonary hypertension
  Kyphoscoliotic heart disease
  Chronic pulmonary embolism
  Other chronic pulmonary heart diseases
  Chronic pulmonary heart disease unspecified
  Other diseases of pulmonary circulation
  Arteriovenous fistula of pulmonary vessels
  Aneurysm of pulmonary artery
  Other specified diseases of pulmonary circulation
  Unspecified disease of pulmonary circulation

Other forms of heart disease (420–429)
  Acute pericarditis
  Other and unspecified acute pericarditis
  Pericarditis, acute, nonspecific
  Acute and subacute endocarditis
  Endocarditis, acute, bacterial
  Acute myocarditis
  Other and unspecified acute myocarditis
  Myocarditis, idiopathic
  Other diseases of pericardium
  Other diseases of endocardium
  Valvular disorder, mitral, NOS
  Valvular disorder, aortic, NOS
  Valvular disorder, tricuspid, NOS
  Valvular disorder, pulmonic, NOS
  Cardiomyopathy
  Endomyocardial fibrosis
  Hypertrophic obstructive cardiomyopathy
  Obscure cardiomyopathy of africa
  Endocardial fibroelastosis
  Other primary cardiomyopathies
  Alcoholic cardiomyopathy
  Nutritional and metabolic cardiomyopathy
  Cardiomyopathy in other diseases classified elsewhere
  Secondary cardiomyopathy unspecified
  Conduction disorders
  Atrioventricular block, third degree
  Atrioventricular block, first degree
  Atrioventricular block, Mobitz II
  Atrioventricular block, Wenckebach's
  Bundle branch block, left
  Bundle branch block, right
  Sinoatrial heart block
  Atrioventricular excitation, anomalous
 Wolff-Parkinson-White syndrome
  Cardiac dysrhythmias
  Tachycardia, paroxysmal supraventricular
  Atrial fibrillation and flutter
  Atrial fibrillation
  Atrial flutter
  Ventricular fibrillation and flutter
  Ventricular fibrillation
  Cardiac arrest
  Premature beats, unspec.
  Other specified cardiac dysrhythmias
  Sick sinus syndrome
  Sinus bradycardia, NOS
  Cardiac dysrhythmia unspecified
 Gallop rhythm
  Heart failure
  Congestive heart failure unspecified
  Left heart failure
 Pulmonary edema, acute
  Systolic heart failure
  Diastolic heart failure
  Heart failure, combined, unspec.
  Ill-defined descriptions and complications of heart disease
  Myocarditis unspecified
  Myocardial degeneration
  Cardiovascular disease unspecified
  Cardiomegaly
  Functional disturbances following cardiac surgery
  Rupture of chordae tendineae
  Rupture of papillary muscle
  Certain sequelae of myocardial infarction not elsewhere classified
  Certain sequelae of myocardial infarction not elsewhere classified acquired cardiac septal defect
  Certain sequelae of myocardial infarction not elsewhere classified other
  Other ill-defined heart diseases
  Other disorders of papillary muscle
  Hyperkinetic heart disease
  Takotsubo syndrome
  Other ill-defined heart diseases
  Heart disease unspecified

Cerebrovascular disease (430–438)
  Subarachnoid hemorrhage
  Intracerebral hemorrhage
  Other and unspecified intracranial hemorrhage
  Hemorrhage, intracranial, NOS
  Occlusion and stenosis of precerebral arteries
  Occlusion and stenosis of basilar artery
  Occlusion and stenosis of carotid artery
  Occlusion and stenosis of vertebral artery
  Occlusion of cerebral arteries
  Cerebral thrombosis
  Cerebral thrombosis without cerebral infarction
  Cerebral thrombosis with cerebral infarction
  Cerebral embolism
  Cerebral embolism without cerebral infarction
  Cerebral embolism with cerebral infarction
  Transient cerebral ischemia
  Basilar artery syndrome
  Vertebral artery syndrome
  Subclavian steal syndrome
  Vertebrobasilar artery syndrome
  Transient ischemic attack, unspec.
  Acute but ill-defined cerebrovascular disease
  Other and ill-defined cerebrovascular disease
  Cerebral atherosclerosis
  Other generalized ischemic cerebrovascular disease
  Hypertensive encephalopathy
  Cerebral aneurysm nonruptured
  Cerebral arteritis
  Moyamoya disease
  Nonpyogenic thrombosis of intracranial venous sinus
  Transient global amnesia
  Late effects of cerebrovascular disease
  Cognitive deficits
  Speech and language deficits
  Speech and language deficits, unspecified
  Aphasia
  Dysphasia
  Other speech and language deficits
  Hemiplegia/hemiparesis
  Hemiplegia affecting unspecified side
  Hemiplegia affecting dominant side
  Hemiplegia affecting nondominant side
  Monoplegia of upper limb
  Monoplegia of lower limb
  Other paralytic syndrome
  Other late effects of cerebrovascular disease
  Apraxia cerebrovascular disease
  Dysphagia cerebrovascular disease
  Facial weakness
  Ataxia
  Vertigo
  CVA, late effect, unspec.

Diseases of arteries, arterioles, and capillaries (440–449)
  Atherosclerosis
  Stenosis of renal artery
  Peripheral Arterial Disease
  Peripheral Arterial Disease with Intermittent Claudication (Also Claudication)
  Peripheral Arterial Disease w/ ulceration
  Aortic aneurysm and dissection
  Aortic Dissection
  Abdominal Aortic Aneurysm, ruptured
  Abdominal aortic Aneurysm, w/o rupture
  Abdominal Aortic Aneurysm, unspecified
  Other aneurysm
  Other peripheral vascular disease
  Raynaud's syndrome
  Thromboangiitis obliterans [Buerger's disease]
  Other arterial dissection
  Dissection of carotid artery
  Dissection of iliac artery
  Dissection of renal artery
  Dissection of vertebral artery
  Dissection of other artery
  Other specified peripheral vascular diseases
  Erythromelalgia
  Peripheral vascular disease, unspecified
  Arterial embolism and thrombosis
  Atheroembolism
  Polyarteritis nodosa and allied conditions
  Kawasaki disease / Acute febrile mucocutaneous lymph node syndrome
  Giant Cell arteritis(Temporal Arteritis)
  Other disorders of arteries and arterioles
  Arteriovenous fistula acquired
  Disease of capillaries
  Septic arterial embolism

Diseases of veins and lymphatics, and other diseases of circulatory system (451–459)
  Phlebitis and thrombophlebitis
  Of deep vessels of lower extremities
  Deep vein thrombosis, femoral
  Deep vein thrombosis, other leg veins
  Of other sites
  Phlebitis, superficial veins, upper extrem.
  Thrombophlebitis, unspec.
  Portal vein thrombosis
  Other venous embolism and thrombosis
  Deep vein thrombosis, unspec.
  Deep vein thrombosis, proximal
  Deep vein thrombosis, distal
  Venous embolism, unspec. site
  Varicose veins of lower extremities
  Varicose veins w/ ulcer
  Varicose veins w/ inflammation
  Varicose veins w/ulcer, inflammation
  Varicose veins, asymptomatic
  Hemorrhoids
  Hemorrhoids, internal w/o complication
  Hemorrhoids, internal w/ complication
  Hemorrhoids, external w/o complication
  Hemorrhoids, external thrombosed
  Hemorrhoids, NOS
  Varicose veins of other sites
  Esophageal varices w/ bleeding
  Esophageal varices w/o bleeding
  Varicocele
  Noninfective disorders of lymphatic channels
  Postmastectomy lymphedema syndrome
  Hypotension
  Orthostatic hypotension
  Iatrogenic hypotension
  Other disorders of circulatory system
  Other specified disorders of circulatory system
  Venous insufficiency, unspec.

International Classification of Diseases